Datuk Ewon Ebin (born 26 June 1954) is a Malaysian politician who served as the Minister of Science, Technology, and Innovation and represented Ranau as the Member of Parliament of Malaysia from 2013 to 2018.

He is the former Vice President of the United Progressive Kinabalu Organisation (UPKO), a political party in the state of Sabah, which he was one of the founders 26 years ago. He left UPKO in February 2020, citing that the party leadership had derailed from its original objectives and failed to protect the welfare of its members, the indigenous Sabahans, and other Malaysians from Sabah. His resignation leads 5,000 UPKO members to quit the party, including committee members from the Ranau division.

In March 2020, Datuk Ewon Ebin declared that he will be joining Parti Gagasan Rakyat Sabah (PGRS) under the leadership of former federal minister Datuk Seri Panglima Anifah Aman.

He is very interested in the problems of natives in Sabah. His thesis at the University of Malaya 1978 was 'A Ranau Dusun Traditional Law Study in Sabah on Marriage, Divorce and Heritage' was one of his contribution.

Personal life 
Ewon was born and raised in Bundu Tuhan, Ranau. A village located at the foot of the tallest mountain in South East Asia, The Mount Kinabalu. He is married with six children and has a Bachelor of Legislative Law (LLB) conferred by the University of Malaya. After graduation, he became a lawyer and owned a Law Firm, Tetuan Vitales Ewon & Co, in Kota Kinabalu. In 1979, Datuk Ewon was appointed as a First Class Magistrate, which he served for more than five years.

Government career 
Datuk Ewon held several government positions. Between 1985 and 2001, he served as the Chairman of Sabah Rubber Fund Board, Chairman of Permodalan Bumiputra Sabah, Director of Sabah Bank and Deputy Chairman of Sabah Economic Development Corporation (SEDCO).

Political career

Member of the Sabah State Legislative Assembly 
Datuk Ewon's political career began to shine when he was at the age of 31. He won the Sabah State Legislative Assembly for N.13 Kundasang in the year 1985 under Parti Bersatu Sabah (PBS), which he held the position for almost 15 years.

From 2004 to 2013, he became the first Member of the Sabah State Legislative Assembly for N.31 Paginatan through United Progressive Kinabalu Organisation. UPKO is another political party in Sabah, which he founded together with Tan Sri Bernard Dompok and other former leaders from Parti Bersatu Sabah.

During his time as a Member of the Sabah State Legislative Assembly, Datuk Ewon Ebin has held various positions in Sabah State Government. Beginning by serving the State as:

 Assistant Minister of Local Government and Housing
 Assistant Minister of Tourism and Environment
 Assistant Minister of Industrial Development

In 2004, Datuk Ewon was appointed by the Chief Minister of Sabah as Minister of Industrial Development. After serving the position for a term, he was assigned to another portfolio as the Minister of Rural Development until the 2013 General Election.

Federal parliamentarian 
In the 2013 general election, Datuk Ewon was elected to the federal Parliament for the seat of P.179 Ranau in the state of Sabah. In his first term in parliament, he was selected to become one of the Prime Minister's Cabinet Minister. He served as the Minister of Science, Technology, and Innovation of Malaysia.

Parti Cinta Sabah (PCS)

On 17 December 2021, he resigned as Vice-President and member of PCS along with many of its leaders, resulting in mass resignations. He stated that the party was disorganised and inactive.

Issues

Illegal immigrants issues 
On 11 January 2009, Sabah Industrial Development Minister Ewon reminded the JKKK about the tactics of illegal immigrants using a fake identity card to steal the aid of the native hardcore poor. Through home visits, the relevant parties can check the actual level of the applicant's poverty thus ensuring that their documents are valid or otherwise.

Rural aid 
On 30 April 2010, Ewon as Sabah Rural Development Minister was present at the Sabah Sejahtera Award at Kampung Mansiang Community Development Center, Menggatal. Also present were Assistant Minister of Resources Development and Information Technology Development, Jainab Ahmad and Permanent Secretary of the Ministry of Rural Development, Ghulam Jelani. The winner is Kampung Tanjung Bulat, Kinabatangan - the state-level Sabah Sejahtera Award winner. Entilibon Village, Tongod (runner up) and Kampung Babagon Penampang (third). All winners receive prizes in the form of a project grant of RM50,000 for the champion, RM40,000 (runner-up) and RM30,000 (third).

Elections 
Since 1985, Ewon has been contesting in the Sabah election in Kundasang. In 1985 Ewon won with a majority of 939 votes. In the 1999 Election, Ewon was opposed by Ramdi Indang (Allied); Karim Bin Adam (PBS) and Benjimin Yasin (Setia). Kundasang's jurisdiction had 11,539 votes.

The previous State Assembly is known as Ranau and has 8639 voters. Ewon (BN/UPKO) 3,224, Janimin Saiun (Independent) 1,673; Ramli Indang (Independent) - 937; Henry Wan Kauting (Setia) 76 and Nayon Gudumi (Independent) - 69.

In the next election, Ewon (PBS) received 4956 votes; Kasitah Gaddam (BN) gets 4,017 votes.

In the 2008 election, Ewon (BN) received 5206 votes; Jahumin Ampadong (Allied) 157; Paul B. Kerangkas (PKR) 1,749 votes and Mat Jaili Samat (Independent) 90 votes. After the victory, he was appointed Sabah's Minister of Rural Development.

Election results

References 

Government ministers of Malaysia
Living people
People from Sabah
Members of the Dewan Rakyat
United Progressive Kinabalu Organisation politicians
Date of birth missing (living people)
1954 births